Academy at the Lakes is a private-independent college preparatory co-educational PreK3–12 school in Land o' Lakes, Florida (metropolitan Tampa).

The school is non-denominational school and has two campuses separated by Collier Parkway. The Wendlek Campus is located on the east side of the street and the McCormick campus is located on the lakefront of Lake Myrtle on the west side.

The Academy currently educates more than 400 students each year and provides its students with abundant opportunities in athletics, the arts, character formation, and community participation. Students and families are divided and assigned within a "house system". This system provides students and families with many cross-age and cross-campus experiences and furthers the Academy's focus upon building community-based relationships.

Beginning in the Lower School, students have opportunities to participate in public speaking and the arts as a part of their core curriculum, taking such courses in subjects such as strings, band, instrumental music, choral music,  choruses, theater, dance, and a full range of visual arts, including photography courses, videography, and sound mixing. Performance is a routine part of the student experience.

The school is fully accredited by the Florida Council of Independent Schools and the Florida Kindergarten Council, and is a full member of the National Association of Independent Schools. Locally, Academy at the Lakes is a member of the Bay Area Association of Independent Schools.

History

In February 2008, the Academy opened a $3.1 million gymnasium, which includes locker rooms, coaches offices, a weight room, and a stage.

Sports
The football team won back-to-back Florida state eight-man championships in 2017 and 2018.

References

External links
 Official website

Private high schools in Florida
Private middle schools in Florida
Private elementary schools in Florida
Preparatory schools in Florida
Education in Pasco County, Florida
Land o' Lakes, Florida